Hans Georg Andersen (May 12, 1919 – April 25, 1994) was an Icelandic diplomat.

From 1946 to 1954 he was legal adviser to the Ministry for Foreign Affairs (Iceland).
In 1948 he was admitted to the bar.
From 1954 to 1 June 1962 he was permanent Representative to the North Atlantic Council in Brussels with coacredition in Paris.
From 1 June 1962 to 1 July 1963 he was  Ambassador in Stockholm.
On 7 September 1962 he was coaccreditated in Helsinki.
From 1 July 1963 to 31 August 1969 he was Ambassador in Oslo with coaccredition in Prague.
From 31 August 1969 to 21 July 1976 he was  legal adviser in the Ministry for Foreign Affairs (Iceland).
From 21 July 1976 to 24 November 1986 he was Ambassador in Washington, D.C.
From 6 October 1976 to 28 April 1987 he was coaccreditated in Ottawa.

References

1919 births
1994 deaths
Ambassadors of Iceland to Belgium
Ambassadors of Iceland to Sweden
Ambassadors of Iceland to Norway
Ambassadors of Iceland to the United States
Harvard Law School alumni
University of Iceland alumni
Icelandic expatriates in France